Major-General Thomas Gordon Rennie CB DSO MBE (3 January 1900 – 24 March 1945) was a British Army officer who served with distinction during World War II. He was the General Officer Commanding (GOC) of the 3rd Infantry Division during the Normandy landings in June 1944. He was injured on 13 June but recovered quickly and was given command of the 51st (Highland) Infantry Division, which he led for the rest of the campaign in Western Europe until he was killed in action during Operation Plunder, the Allied crossing of the River Rhine, in March 1945.

Military career

Educated at Loretto School and the Royal Military College, Sandhurst, Rennie was commissioned as a second lieutenant into the Black Watch (Royal Highland Regiment) on 16 July 1919.

After attending the Staff College, Camberley from 1933 to 1934, he saw active service in the Second World War, was taken prisoner at Saint-Valery-en-Caux during the final stages of the Battle of France in June 1940, but then escaped nine days later.

He was made Commanding Officer (CO) of the 5th Battalion, Black Watch (Royal Highland Regiment) in 1942, leading the battalion at the Second Battle of El Alamein in October 1942, and then becoming Commander of the 154th Infantry Brigade and leading that formation for the Allied invasion of Sicily in July 1943.

Towards the end of 1943 it was decided to withdraw the 51st Division, together with three other battle-experienced formations, back to Britain in order to strengthen the Anglo-Canadian 21st Army Group for the Allied invasion of Normandy, scheduled to take place in the spring of 1944. Rennie's brigade therefore arrived in England in late November. On 12 December Rennie was promoted to the acting rank of major-general and received a new appointment as the General Officer Commanding (GOC) of the 3rd Infantry Division. The 3rd Division was one of the original divisions of the Regular Army and had fought under Montgomery's command with the BEF in 1940. Since then it had not served overseas and had only seen service in the United Kingdom until being transferred in mid-1943 to the 21st Army Group, then commanded by General Sir Bernard Paget. As a result, by the time Rennie succeeded Major-General William Ramsden as GOC, he found the division, then training in combined operations in Scotland, to be extremely well trained but almost completely lacking in experience in battle. In April 1944 the division was sent to Southern England to begin its final preparations for the invasion of Normandy, where it was to be one of the assaulting formations for the initial stages of the invasion.

He was then made General Officer Commanding 51st (Highland) Infantry Division but in March 1945, after crossing the Rhine, he was killed by mortar fire. He left behind a widow and two children.

He is buried in Reichswald Forest War Cemetery.

References

Bibliography

External links

British Army Officers 1939−1945
Generals of World War II

|-

1900 births
1945 deaths
British escapees
Black Watch officers
British Army generals of World War II
British Army personnel killed in World War II
Companions of the Distinguished Service Order
Companions of the Order of the Bath
Graduates of the Royal Military College, Sandhurst
Graduates of the Staff College, Camberley
Members of the Order of the British Empire
People educated at Loretto School, Musselburgh
People from Fuzhou
Generals from Fujian